Kim St-Pierre (born December 14, 1978 in Châteauguay, Quebec) is a Canadian ice hockey player. She is a three-time Olympic gold medallist and five-time IIHF world champion. She was announced as a Hockey Hall of Fame inductee on June 24, 2020. She was named to the Order of Hockey in Canada in 2022.

Playing career

McGill
In 1998-99, she was the top rookie for the McGill Martlets women's ice hockey team. She was also the first woman in Canadian Interuniversity Sports history to win a men’s regular season game when McGill University defeated Ryerson University on November 15, 2003 by a score of 5-2.

International play
Kim St. Pierre was the goaltender for Team Canada in the 2002 Salt Lake City Olympics, and was the starting goaltender in Team Canada's 3-2 victory over Team USA in the gold medal final. She also played for the Canadian women's team in Turin. St. Pierre holds numerous records in international competition, including most shutouts (15), most wins (24), and lowest goals against average (0.84). She received a gold medal in the Women's Hockey game at the 2010 Vancouver Winter Olympics. St. Pierre retired from international play in April 2013.

CWHL
St-Pierre formerly played for the Montreal Stars of the Canadian Women's Hockey League. In 2007-08, she was voted the CWHL Top Goaltender and a CWHL Eastern All-Star. By winning the 2009 Clarkson Cup, St. Pierre won the top three trophies in women's ice hockey, becoming the third woman to win the Clarkson Cup, an Olympic gold medal (in 2002, 2006, and 2010), and a gold medal at the IIHF women's world hockey championships.

St. Pierre did not play the 2011–12 Canada women's national ice hockey team season (along with the Stars season) to have a baby.

Montreal Canadiens practice
St. Pierre made women's ice hockey history on October 23, 2008, when she tended goal during a practice session with the Montreal Canadiens at Denis Savard Arena. Carey Price was out with the flu. She was the second woman in NHL history to play alongside NHL players, since Manon Rhéaume in an exhibition game. Wearing her usual #33 jersey, Alexei Kovalev put a wrist shot past her ear and Francis Bouillon blasted a slapshot that just missed her mask and deflected off the crossbar. St.Pierre referred to the experience as "priceless".

Awards and honours
 CWHL Top Goaltender, 2007–08 and 2008–09
 CWHL First All-Star Team, 2008–09
 CWHL Eastern All-Stars, 2007–08
 CIAU Championship game Most Valuable Player in 2000
 CIS Most Outstanding Player in 2003
 Most Valuable Player, 2002 Esso Women's Nationals
 Top Goaltender at the 2001 World Championships
 Top Goaltender at the 2004 World Championships
 Top Goaltender at the 2002 Winter Olympics
 Top Goaltender at the 2002 Esso Canadian National Championship
 Named to the Order of Hockey in Canada in 2022.

References

External links
  Official website of Kim St-Pierre

1978 births
Canadian women's ice hockey goaltenders
Clarkson Cup champions
French Quebecers
Hockey Hall of Fame inductees
Ice hockey people from Quebec
Ice hockey players at the 2002 Winter Olympics
Ice hockey players at the 2006 Winter Olympics
Ice hockey players at the 2010 Winter Olympics
Living people
McGill Martlets ice hockey players
McGill University alumni
Medalists at the 2010 Winter Olympics
Medalists at the 2006 Winter Olympics
Medalists at the 2002 Winter Olympics
Les Canadiennes de Montreal players
Olympic gold medalists for Canada
Olympic ice hockey players of Canada
Olympic medalists in ice hockey
Order of Hockey in Canada recipients
People from Châteauguay